French submarine Foucault (Q70) was a Laubeuf type submarine of the Brumaire class, built for the French Navy prior to World War I.

Design and construction 
Foucault was ordered by the French Navy as part of its 1906 programme and was laid down at the Cherbourg Naval Yard in November of that year. Work progressed slowly, and she was not launched until 15 June 1912. She was commissioned on 20 June 1914. 
Foucault was equipped with licence-built M.A.N. diesel engines for surface propulsion, and electric motors for power while submerged. She carried eight torpedoes, two internally and six externally.
Foucault was named for Léon Foucault, the 19th century French physicist.

Service history
At the outbreak of the First World War Foucault was part of the French Mediterranean Fleet, and sailed with that force to the Adriatic tasked with bringing the Austro-Hungarian Fleet to battle or blockading it in its home ports.

On 15 September 1916, while on patrol off Cattaro under the command of Lt. L. Devin, Foucault was spotted under the surface by two Austro-Hungarian Lohner L seaplanes. These were L132, flown by Lts. Konjovics and Sewera, and L135 (Lts. Zelezny and Klimburg). The two planes bombed Foucault, scoring hits which forced her to surface. Unable to dive and without power, Devin ordered her to be abandoned and scuttled. All her crew escaped without casualties. The seaplanes landed and took the crew prisoner, holding them until the arrival of an Austrian torpedo boat. This incident was the first instance of a submarine at sea being sunk by air attack.

Notes

Bibliography

 Moore, J: Jane’s Fighting Ships of World War I (1919, reprinted 2003) 
 Price, A: Aircraft versus Submarine (1973)

External links
 Castel, Marc: Foucault at Sous-marins Français 1863 - pagesperso-orange.fr (French)
 Sieche, Erwin: French naval operations in the Adriatic at gwpda.org

Brumaire-class submarines
World War I submarines of France
1911 ships
Ships built in France
Maritime incidents in 1916
Scuttled vessels
Lost submarines of France
World War I shipwrecks in the Adriatic Sea
Submarines sunk by aircraft